Laval, Quebec-based Groupe Galland, together with its affiliated companies Autobus Galland ltée, Galland Laurentides ltée, Centre du Camion Galland ltée, Les Autobus Duplessis inc. and Galland Mont-Tremblant ltée, operates charter and scheduled intercity coaches, school buses and paratransit vehicles, as well as providing maintenance service for heavy vehicles.

Groupe Galland operates 150 buses and offers courier services via bus parcel express.

History
In 1941, Paul Galland founded the company in Sainte-Scholastique, Quebec. He later retired and turned the business over to his sons. 

In 2004 or 2005, the company acquired the Montreal to Laurentians bus routes formerly operated by Limocar.

Operations
 Montreal to Mont-Tremblant, Quebec route
 Montreal to Mont-Laurier, Quebec route
 Mont-Tremblant public transit

References
 Official site

Bus transport in Quebec
Companies based in Laval, Quebec
Intercity bus companies of Canada